North Battleford was a federal electoral district in Saskatchewan, Canada, that was represented in the House of Commons of Canada from 1917 to 1949.

This riding was created in 1914 from parts of Battleford, Prince Albert and Saskatoon ridings.

It initially consisted of the northwestern part of the province, north of the North Saskatchewan River and west of the third meridian. It was redefined in 1924 and 1933.

The electoral district was abolished in 1947 when it was redistributed into Prince Albert, Rosetown—Biggar and The Battlefords ridings.

Members of Parliament

Election results

See also 

 List of Canadian federal electoral districts
 Past Canadian electoral districts

External links 
 
 

Former federal electoral districts of Saskatchewan